The Jerwood Painting Prize was a prize for originality and excellence in painting in the United Kingdom, awarded and funded by the Jerwood Foundation. It was open to all artists born or resident in the UK, regardless of age or reputation. Winners of the prize include Craigie Aitchison, Patrick Caulfield, Prunella Clough and Maggi Hambling. The prize was instituted in 1994, and at £30,000 was the largest of its kind in Britain. The prize is no longer awarded.

Prize winners

The winners of the prize were:
 1994: Craigie Aitchison
 1995: Maggi Hambling and Patrick Caulfield
 1996: John Hubbard
 1997: Gary Hume
 1998: Madeleine Strindberg
 1999: Prunella Clough
 2000: no award
 2001: Katie Pratt
 2002: Callum Innes
 2003: Shani Rhys James

See also

 Jerwood Award
 Jerwood Drawing Prize
 List of European art awards

References

Painting
British art awards
Awards established in 1994
1994 establishments in the United Kingdom